Oriental Bank may refer to:
 Oriental Bank PLC, or Oriental Bank, a commercial bank founded in Phnom Penh, Cambodia in 2021
 Oriental Bank Corporation, a British imperial bank founded in India in 1842 
 Oriental Bank, which merged with Consolidated National Bank of New York in 1909 to form National Reserve Bank
 OFG Bancorp, or Oriental Bank, a financial holding company in San Juan, Puerto Rico
 Oriental Bank of Commerce, a former Indian public sector bank
 M Oriental Bank, formerly Oriental Commercial Bank Limited, a commercial bank in Kenya

See also